Guam Highway 15 (GH-15) is one of the primary automobile highways in the United States territory of Guam.

Route description
GH-15's route covers mainly the northeast coast of Guam. Beginning off of GH-4 in Chalan Pago-Ordot, GH-15 proceeds eastward into Mangilao, where it intersects GH-10. GH-15 continues east until it approaches the east coast. From there, GH-15 generally follows the coastline. Towards the northern edge of Mangilao, GH-15 meets the southern end of GH-26, heading north towards Dededo. GH-15 eventually crosses into Yigo and starts moving gradually inland. Shortly after passing GH-15's most notable attraction, the Guam International Raceway, GH-15 makes its final major junction, with GH-29, a connector to GH-1 and the main gate to Andersen Air Force Base. GH-15 finally continues north until it ends at Andersen AFB's rear gate.

Major intersections

References

15